Sradhanjali Samantaray (born 5 July 1978 in Banapur, Odisha) is a former Indian women's footballer and the current head coach of the Odisha Police women's team and assistant coach of the Odisha women's football team. She is a former Indian international footballer and has served as the captain of the India women's national football team.

In 2014, she was appointed as assistant coach of India's U-16 Girls Football team for the 2015 Asian Football Confederation Cup.

In 2022, she has completed long 31 years in the field of football in various capacities.

International goals

Honours

Orissa
 Senior Women's National Football Championship: 2010–11,  runner-up: 2001–02, 2009–10
 National Games Gold medal: 2011, Bronze medal: 2002

References 

1978 births
Living people
People from Khordha district
Sportswomen from Odisha
Footballers from Odisha
Indian women's footballers
India women's international footballers
Footballers at the 1998 Asian Games
Women's association footballers not categorized by position
Asian Games competitors for India
Indian football coaches
Indian football managers